Quentin Durward is a French-German swashbuckler TV series. It was produced in 1970, directed by Gilles Grangier and broadcast in 1971. The series starred the German actor Amadeus August as the protagonist and the French actress Marie-France Boyer as Isabelle de Croye. The series was based on Sir Walter Scott's in 1823 published novel Quentin Durward. It concerns a Scottish soldier who serves French King Louis XI (1423-1483) while the King has to overcome the schemes of his rival Charles the Bold and Jean Balue. The TV series kept close to the classic novel and was often shot at historic French locations. The French version consists of 7 instalments of 52 minutes each, while the dubbed German version had 13 episodes of about 25 minutes apiece. Both versions have been made available on DVD.

Storyline 
In a monastery in Scotland on the day of an ordination to the priesthood, Quentin Durward, a dashing young man of noble background, is about to be consecrated. The monks beseech him to devote his life to God in order to save his life. He is reminded that he would have been dead already if it hadn't been for the monks and their solemn promise to make him one of them. By listening to the monks while they are berating young Quentin, the audience learns that Quentin's clan has been wiped out as the result of a feud. The hostile clan who killed Quentin's kin is determined to put an end to the bloodline one way or the other. Either he takes the oath to live in celibacy or he won't be spared any longer after all. While they raid the monastery he manages to escape his pursuers and to reach the English Channel. He heads for France because his only living relative, his uncle Lludovic Cunningham (played by Noël Roquevert), serves as a member of the Scottish Guard. At the same time Isabelle de Croye, who is also an orphan, secretly leaves the Kingdom of Burgundy in order to elude an arranged marriage and find shelter in France too. They run into each other, fall in love and after many adventures they marry in the Abbey Notre Dame of Morienval.

Gallery 
Locations appearing in the series:

Cast 
Amadeus August: Quentin Durward
Marie-France Boyer: Isabelle de Croye
Noël Roquevert: Ludovic Lesly
William Sabatier: Charles the Bold
Michel Vitold: Louis XI of France
Roger Pigaut: Jean d'Orléans
Denis Savignat: Le Duc d'Orléans
André Valmy: Olivier le Daim
Robert Party: Comte de Campobasso
Clarisse Deudon: Harmeline de Croye
Claire Maurier: Marion
Philippe Avron: Bertrand
Georges Marchal: Crèvecœur
Jacques Monod: Jean Balue
André Oumansky: Leyradin
Guy Kerner: Tristan L'Hermite

See also 
 The Adventures of Quentin Durward, the 1955 film

External links

References 

Television series set in the 15th century
German drama television series
French drama television series
1970s French television miniseries
1970s German television miniseries
Television shows based on works by Walter Scott
1970s French television series
1971 French television series debuts
1971 German television series debuts
1971 French television series endings
1971 German television series endings
French adventure television series
Cultural depictions of Charles the Bold
Cultural depictions of Louis XI of France